Hush Little Baby is a novel written for teenagers by Caroline B. Cooney. It was published in 1998.

Plot
Kit Innes is a high school student living with her mother and stepfather. As she retrieves a sweatshirt from her father's house, she is approached by her disheveled ex-stepmother, Dusty. Kit is stunned when Dusty hands her a newborn baby and a diaper bag before driving away, not even bothering to tell Kit his name.

To the best of her ability, Kit tries to care for the baby, who she names Sam. The doorbell rings, so she opens the door. She finds a shabby looking man standing before her, looking for Dusty. Kit denies any knowledge of Dusty's baby and claims that she hasn't seen Dusty in a while. Kit shuts the door, but she suspects that the man is trying to look into the windows. Feeling threatened, she grabs a disposable camera and takes a picture of his license plate. Finding nothing, the man leaves.

Kit decides to bring Sam back to her mother's house when Rowen Mason, Kit's potential boyfriend, arrives in tow with his nine years old sister, Muffin. Kit then receives a call from a lady named Cinda, who explains the whole situation. Apparently, Cinda and her husband, Burt, were supposed to adopt Dusty's baby, and the man who came to Kit's house earlier was Dusty's cousin. Kit is reassured by Cinda and promises to deliver Sam to her.

Cinda and Burt's house is located in a wooded area with no neighbors. Burt tries to grab the camera out of Kit's hand when she starts taking pictures. Meanwhile, Muffin has to go to the bathroom. With all the adults preoccupied with Sam, she ventures into the house and is shocked to find the house in a mess with pizza boxes on the floor and no soap in the bathroom. Muffin accuses Cinda of not knowing how to properly care for a baby. Kit also senses that something is not right. Taking Sam from Cinda, she tells them that they should all wait for Dusty to come back before doing anything.

At her father's house, Kit leaves a voice message for her father about Dusty. Dusty and her cousin, Ed, enter the house and agree to spend a night before sorting things out in the morning. As Kit runs upstairs to grab a flannel blanket, Dusty and Ed run out with Sam. Rowen and Muffin follow their car. Dusty and her cousin both stop at a house, and Muffin tries to rescue Sam. Ed catches Muffin and instructs Rowen to throw his car keys into the woods. After Rowen does, Ed takes off with Muffin and Sam.

In the meantime, Kit unknowingly opens the door to Burt and Cinda, who imitated Muffin's voice. At home, the answering machine goes off with Kit's father telling her that he called the police. Burt and Cinda freak out at the mention of the police, and Cinda grabs a kitchen knife. They put Kit in a car, where Cinda tells Kit of her mastermind plan. She, Burt, Dusty, and Ed were part of an ATM scam. They would use fake ATM's to collect the bank card numbers, and then Dusty would redraw money from the bank accounts. Kit is rescued by a policeman, but Cinda refuses to tell them where Sam is.

Rowen, without his car, runs to the nearest truck and tells them everything. Muffin, stuck in the car with Ed, carefully uses Morse code to signal SOS to another car. In the end, Dusty, Burt, Ed, and Cinda are all under arrest, and Sam is put under foster care.

Characters
Kit Innes is a high school student who alternates homes between her stepfather and mom and her biological father. She is level-headed and is friends with Rowen and Muffin's cousin, Shea. Kit also plays the flute in the school band.
Rowen Mason is a high school student who lives with his nine-year-old sister and his strict parents.
Margaret "Muffin" Mason is the sister of Rowen. She craves the laidback lifestyle of her cousin, Shea.
Dusty Innes is the ex-stepmother of Kit, whom she depended on for moral support, especially during her divorce. Dusty is often regarded as ditzy and is even known for having a doll collection.

1999 American novels